Millars may refer to:
Millars or Mijares River in Aragon and the Valencian Community 
Millars or Millares town in the comarca of Canal de Navarrés, Valencian Community
Millars or Millas commune in the Pyrénées-Orientales department
Millars Corners, a community in North Grenville, Ontario